The Office of the Telecommunications Authority (OFTA) is the legislative body responsible for regulating the telecommunications industry in Hong Kong. The OFTA has liberalized all telecom sectors and there are no foreign ownership restrictions.

In the local fixed-line market there is neither a pre-set limit on the number of licenses issued nor deadline for applications. , there are nine fixed-line licensees: PCCW-HKT, New World Telephone Limited, Wharf T & T Limited, Hutchison Global Crossing Limited, Hong Kong Broadband Network Limited, Eastar Technology Limited, CM Tel. (HK) Limited, TraxComm Limited and HKC Network Limited. Consequently, the telephone density is, with 56 lines per 100 people, among the highest in the world.

 there are 197 licensed Internet Service Providers (ISP) in Hong Kong, providing dial-up or broadband services. Hong Kong is the second after South Korea in terms of broadband penetration rate (53%).

With regard to mobile services, the OFTA awarded four 3G licenses in 2001: Hong Kong CSL Limited, Hutchison 3G (HK) Limited, SmartTone 3G Limited and Sunday 3G (HK) Limited The first 3G mobile services were launched in January 2004. Moreover, these four 3G operators, together with New World Mobility and Peoples Telephone Company Limited operate a total of eleven GSM networks. Thus the mobile density  is one of the highest in the world (106.3%).

Telecommunication company 
, the penetration rate in Hong Kong was estimated at 240.8% over a population estimate of over 7.325 million. Hong Kong's telecom regulator is the Office of the Communications Authority (OFCA).

See also
 Communications in Hong Kong
 Economy of Hong Kong

Footnotes

Telecommunications in Hong Kong
Telecommunication industry